Kessel-Lo (population 26,000) is a town in Belgium. It is a borough of Leuven, situated to the east and north of Leuven proper. Kessel-Lo is bordered by Holsbeek, Lubbeek, and several other sub-municipalities that are part of Leuven (Leuven municipality comprises the historic sub-municipalities of Heverlee, Wilsele, Wijgmaal, Leuven proper and Kessel-Lo). Though Kessel-Lo is a part of Leuven municipality, it has its own postal code: 3010.

Its name is derived from "Kessel" (from the Latin "Castellum" for fortress, referring to a fortress that once stood on the Kessel mountain) and "Lo" (forest clearing).

Kessel-Lo is home to the Provinciaal Domein Kessel-Lo, a large provincial park with ponds, playgrounds, soccer fields, and other areas for recreational activities. The town has nice smaller public parks such as Park Bellevue and Park Michotte and is also known for Vlierbeek Abbey, an old Benedictine abbey built in 1125.

Several youth organisations are present in Kessel-Lo, such as Chiro Don Bosco, Chiro Vlierbeek, Scouts Vlierbeek, Chiro Blauwput, Chiro Hekeko, Scouts De Vlievleger and Scouts Boven-lo.

A local brewery has recently been founded called "De Vlier". They brew a blond beer called "Kessel's Blond".

Kessel-Lo is also the proud home of the Rugby Club Leuven and Thijs Vandebon and Teun Vandermeulen.

Sub-municipalities of Leuven
Populated places in Flemish Brabant